Latchley railway station served the village of Latchley, Cornwall, England, from 1908 to 1966 on the Callington Branch.

History 
The station was opened on 2 March 1908 by the Plymouth, Devonport and South Western Junction Railway. It was built on the former site of Cox's Park Depot of the East Cornwall Mineral Railway. When the station master was removed in 1936, the station became an unstaffed halt. It had a siding which was worked by a ground frame. Freight trains used this but it was removed in 1949. The 1938 and 1956 editions of the handbook of stations and British Rail tickets referred to this station as Latchley Halt. It closed on 7 November 1966.

References 

Disused railway stations in Cornwall
Railway stations in Great Britain opened in 1908
Railway stations in Great Britain closed in 1966
1908 establishments in England
1966 disestablishments in England
Beeching closures in England